The Last of Us: Escape the Dark is an upcoming tabletop role-playing game published by Themeborne. Based on Naughty Dog's video game The Last of Us, the tabletop game was developed in partnership with Naughty Dog as an extension of Themeborne's Escape the Dark games. The game allows up to five players to control characters from The Last of Us. The goal is to reach safety from enemies while exploring locations from the game. Themeborne announced the game in November 2022; it was funded through a Kickstarter campaign, and is due for release in December 2023.

Gameplay 
The Last of Us: Escape the Dark is based on the video game The Last of Us, allowing up to five players to control characters from the game: Joel, Ellie, Tommy, Tess, Bill, and Marlene. The goal is to reach safety from enemies such as Hunters and Infected. The game begins in an abandoned quarantine zone; players explore locations from the game—including the sewers, suburbs, and university—in an attempt to reach Tommy's safe community in Jackson, Wyoming. Each player begins with a hang-up—a unique problem that holds them back from their full potential—and journeys to overcome it and unlock a gameplay perk; survival grants rewards such as materials for crafting equipment. Represented on their character cards, each character possesses different abilities, such as Joel's physical strength and Ellie's agility. When performing actions that face resistance, players roll a character-specific die to determine their success.

Dice and cards are used to simulate an open world. At the beginning of each game, players generate card decks for each location, which are placed across the board; every location in connected to several others, which allows players to select new routes upon each playthrough. The location decks consist of cards representing chapters, camps, and stashed items. Chapter cards feature different events, which may lead to the acquisition of new information, equipment, or items for players to use; alternatively, they may feature outcomes that hinder the journey. Players can travel by horse or truck to access locations at a greater distance. Upon reaching a location, players can choose to explore via chapter card, or camp. After players complete their actions for the day, time passes and they must decide their actions for the following day.

Threat tokens indicate to what extent each location is overrun by Infected; if a location is too overrun, it will become blocked and players will be forced to circumvent it. Spread cards indicate where the Infected may appear; the threat of their presence increases each day. Upon encountering Infected, players engage in combat. The difficulty of combat encounters is determined on the threat level of the enemy card; players must achieve a certain number of wins to be successful, and their chances of success are increased by using equipment and weapons. Players use a combination of item cards and dice to combat enemies; they can select different attack and defence strategies, including stealth or heavy combat.

Development 
The Last of Us: Escape the Dark was announced on November 1, 2022, as a partnership between game company Themeborne and The Last of Us developer Naughty Dog. Neil Druckmann, Naughty Dog co-president and co-director and writer of The Last of Us games, was a fan of Themeborne's Escape the Dark games. The developers were interested in the open world and player choice aspects. They wanted character development to be a significant part of the game due to its importance in The Last of Us games, which led to the development of hang-ups. They wanted to maintain the atmosphere of previous Escape the Dark games and found the post-apocalyptic setting a suitable match. The game retains the monochromatic aesthetic of Themeborne's Escape the Dark games. Themeborne's Thomas Pike serves as the game's writer, as well as a game designer alongside artist Alex Crispin.

The game was funded through a Kickstarter campaign, which ran from November 8 to December 2; it tripled its  goal within the first day, with more than 4,000 supporters. A collector's edition was available for Kickstarter supporters, featuring 3D tokens of the playable characters. The game is due for release in December 2023.

References 

American role-playing games
Kickstarter-funded tabletop games
Escape the Dark
Role-playing games based on video games